Saadi Metro Station is a station in  Tehran Metro Line 1. It is located in the junction of Saadi Street and Jomhuri-ye Eslami Street. It is between Imam Khomeini Metro Station and Darvaze Dolat Metro Station.

Tehran Metro stations